GTFO is a survival horror first-person shooter cooperative game developed by Swedish indie studio 10 Chambers. GTFO had its initial release on December 9, 2019, for Microsoft Windows, on Steam's Early Access to a positive user reception. The game was officially released two years later, on December 10, 2021, during The Game Awards 2021.

Plot 
The Chicxulub crater was formed 66 million years ago by an asteroid strike that resulted in a mass extinction that wiped out the dinosaurs. A team of "prisoners" are forced to go down into an underground complex built on the asteroid site to scavenge and carry out tasks for a mysterious entity known as The Warden.

Gameplay 
GTFO players form a team of four scavengers who are forced to explore the vast underground complex in order to complete the Warden's objectives. Complicating the process is the presence of hideous sleeping monsters, who have overrun the whole area. The players must strategize, plan, ration resources
and stealthily kill enemies to survive, and work to fulfill the Warden's demands and be allowed to escape.

Reception

Pre-release 
GTFO received a warm reception at The Game Awards 2017. A year later, it received an accolade as the Best Cooperative Game at E3 2018 from the website DualShockers. Other sites such as Rock Paper Shotgun and Gamereactor praised it for its horror, atmosphere and gameplay, both considering it among the best games of E3 2018, and considering the game horrifying from their gameplay previews.

The game was nominated in "The Best Game You Suck At" category at the 2020 and 2022 Steam Awards.

References

External links 

Early access video games
First-person shooters
Horror video games
Multiplayer video games
2021 video games
Video games developed in Sweden
Video games scored by Simon Viklund
Windows games
Windows-only games
Video games set in Mexico